Los Zapaticos me Aprietan is a Cuban short film that uses documentary footage of people's shoes to convey a political message. The film was directed by Humberto Padrón

Awards
Mention for Sound Design, Festival CinePlaza, 1999
Mention for Directing, Festival CinePlaza., 1999
Gran Prize for Documentary, Festival CinePlaza, 1999
Best Director in NON FICTION en Festival IMAGO, 1999
Gran Premio de Dirección at Festival IMAGO, 1999.
First Prize for Fiction at the National Festival of Cine Clubs Yumurí, 2000.
Gran Prize Atenas at the National Festivals of Cine Clubs Yumurí, 2000.
Vitral Prize for Best Experimental Film en el 13th Encuentro Nacional de Vídeo, 2000.

See also 
 List of Cuban films

Cuban short films
1990s Spanish-language films
1999 films
Cuban documentary films